Kuorinka is a medium-sized lake in the Vuoksi main catchment area. It is located in the region of Northern Karelia in Finland.

Whole lake and the shores (13 km2) are protected in Natura 2000 conservation program (code FI0700089) due to lakes oligotrophic waters containing very few minerals of sandy plains.

See also
List of lakes in Finland

References

Lakes of Liperi